Miura is a Japanese surname. Notable people with the surname include:

, Japanese author
, Japanese lieutenant general
, Japanese singer and dancer
, Japanese freestyle skier
, Japanese actor
, Japanese stage actor
, Japanese mixed martial artist
, Japanese swimmer
, Japanese professional ice hockey defenceman
, Japanese shogi player
, Japanese football player
, Japanese suspected murderer
, Japanese skier
, Japanese manga artist
, Japanese astrophysicist, inventor, and origamist 
, Japanese boxer
, Japanese voice actress
, Japanese ice hockey player
, Japanese translator
, Japanese karateka
, Japanese swimmer
, Japanese women's footballer
, Japanese middle-distance runner
, Japanese actor
, Japanese bobsledder
, Japanese author
, Japanese writer
, Japanese ice hockey player
, Japanese opera singer
, Japanese actor
, Japanese footballer and manager
, Japanese linguist
, Japanese alpinist and skier
, Japanese ski mountaineer and trail runner

See also
Mura (surname)

References

Japanese-language surnames